Victor Eriakpo Ubogu (born 8 September 1964) is a former Bath and England rugby union player.

Arriving in the UK from Lagos, Nigeria in 1977, he attended West Buckland School in Devon he received the school's top award, the Fortescue Medal.  While at school he played for England Under 18s.  He went on to the University of Birmingham to study Chemical engineering.  While at university he played for Moseley.  He went on to St Anne's College, Oxford where he was selected to play with University of Oxford RFC and achieved his Blue.  After leaving Oxford he joined Bath Rugby. He started for Bath in the victorious 1998 Heineken Cup Final as they defeated Brive. In 1992 he became a prop for the England national rugby union team where he remained until 1999.

Combining the size and strength typical of a prop with unusual speed for a player specializing in this position, Ubogu was often a highly effective ball-carrier in broken play. Against well-drilled international defences he sometimes lacked penetration, but he frequently embarrassed club-level opposition.

Ubogo founded the "Shoeless Joe's" chain of sports bars. In 2001, Ubogu appeared on Lily Savage's Blankety Blank. Since 2004 he has run a high-end travel and sporting hospitality company, using his initials as its name.

References

External links
Victor Ubogu Profile
Victor Ubogu's sport hospitality company
Sunday Times article 28 February 2010
Independent article 4 November 1999
Bath Chronicle article 10 May 2011

1964 births
Living people
Alumni of St Anne's College, Oxford
Alumni of the University of Birmingham
Bath Rugby players
Black British sportsmen
England international rugby union players
English rugby union players
Moseley Rugby Football Club players
Nigerian emigrants to the United Kingdom
Oxford University RFC players
People educated at West Buckland School
Rugby union props